The New Hampshire Marine Patrol is a division of the New Hampshire Department of Safety. NHMP headquarters is located in Gilford, New Hampshire in Glendale Bay on Lake Winnipesaukee. HQ houses a number of part-time police officers, full-time police officers, communications personnel, and civilian employees. Marine Patrol operates year-round, with year-round patrols in the seacoast area and limited patrols on lakes during the "off season" (spring, fall, and winter) due to low boating activity and ice.

The NHMP Bureau is essentially split into three separate patrol divisions:

Winnipesaukee Division
Field Division
Coastal Division

Duties of NHMP
Patrol assigned areas using State patrol boats
Respond to emergencies and other calls for assistance
Enforce State boating and criminal laws
Investigate boating accidents and drownings
Provide seacoast security
Conduct inspections of commercial boats and testing of commercial boat operators
Conduct boating safety education classes
Install, maintain, and remove State marine aids to navigation (over 5,000 in the state)
Conduct criminal investigations and generate cases for prosecution
Interact with other law enforcement and safety agencies

Vessels
NHMP uses a variety of different vessels for different tasks/patrol areas. The department's most recognizable/popular patrol boat is the Ambar 8 meter patrol boat, a  aluminum RIB (Rigid-Hull Inflatable Boat). These vessels are equipped with state-of-the-art GPS & radar, along with twin  engines. Weighing in at roughly only , these patrol boats are capable of relatively quick maneuvers, and high speeds for a boat of its size.

Rank structure/Insignia

See also

List of law enforcement agencies in New Hampshire

External links
NH Department of Safety, Field Operations Bureau, Marine Patrol Unit

Marine Patrol
Maritime law enforcement agencies of the United States